The 1963 Kansas City Chiefs season was the 4th and inaugural season for the Kansas City Chiefs as a professional AFL franchise;  Despite winning the AFL championship game the previous year, the Chiefs were 5–7–2 in 1963, third in the four-team Western  division. The Chiefs were winless for two months in the middle of the season and were eliminated from the postseason in mid-November after ten games. They finished the season with three consecutive wins at home, with diminished attendance. Their 27–27 tie with the Buffalo Bills in September was the first tie in franchise history.

For the previous three seasons, the team was known as the Dallas Texans and played at the Cotton Bowl. Owner and founder Lamar Hunt moved the team following the 1962 AFL Championship.  Despite enormous success in Dallas, the city could not sustain two professional football franchises (the other being the NFL's Dallas Cowboys).  The team was renamed the Kansas City Chiefs and moved into Municipal Stadium alongside the Kansas City Athletics baseball team. The Chiefs 59–7 victory over the Denver Broncos in week 1 set two franchise records that still stand as of the end of the 2021 season: points scored in a game (59) and largest margin of victory (52).

Move to Kansas City

After three seasons in Texas, including an AFL championship in 1962, it was apparent that Dallas couldn’t support two teams. Hunt investigated opportunities to move his team to several cities for the 1963 season, including Miami, Atlanta, Seattle, and New Orleans. Hunt wanted to find a city to which he could commute easily from Dallas, and when he was unable to secure Tulane Stadium in New Orleans because the university didn’t want its football program to compete with a pro team, he was persuaded by Mayor H. Roe Bartle to move to Kansas City, Missouri.

The negotiations in Kansas City were conducted in secrecy. On several occasions Hunt and Jack Steadman, the team's general manager, were in Kansas City and met with businessmen. Bartle introduced Hunt as "Mr. Lamar" in all the meetings with other Kansas City businessmen. Steadman was introduced as "Jack X."

Most impressive about this move was the support the team received from the community even before the team announced the move. Hunt made the move dependent upon the ability of Mayor Bartle and the Kansas City community to guarantee him 35,000 in season ticket sales. Hunt had arrived at this number because that was the Texans' average attendance at the Cotton Bowl in Dallas. An ambitious campaign took shape to deliver on Bartle's guarantee to Hunt of tripling the season-ticket base the Texans had enjoyed in Dallas. Kansas City's mayor also promised to add 3,000 permanent seats to Municipal Stadium, as well as 11,000 temporary bleacher seats. Along with Bartle, a number of other prominent Kansas Citians stepped forward to aid in the efforts, putting together more than 1,000 workers to sell season tickets.

Bartle called to his office 20 business leaders and called upon them to form an association later known as "The Gold Coats", whose sole objective was to sell and take down payments on the 35,000 season tickets required. Not an easy task when one considers the move was still secret and "The Gold Coats" had to sell season tickets to people without knowing the team name, where it was coming from, who the owner was, which football league they played in, who the players or coaches were, when the team played its first game in Kansas City, or where it played. Hunt gave Bartle a four-month deadline; Bartle and "The Gold Coats" made good in only eight weeks. Later, Hunt admitted he was really only hoping for 20,000, for which he still would have moved the franchise. On May 22, Hunt announced he was moving the franchise to Kansas City, Missouri.

Hunt, with a roster replete with players who had played college football in Texas, wanted to maintain a lineage to the team's roots and wanted to call the club the Kansas City Texans. "The Lakers stayed the Lakers when they moved from Minnesota to California", he reasoned. "But Jack Steadman convinced me that wasn’t too smart. It wouldn’t sell."  The team was renamed the Chiefs—one of the most popular suggestions Hunt received in a name-the-team contest and began playing in Kansas City's Municipal Stadium in 1963. A name also considered at the time for the team was the Kansas City Mules.

The name, "Chiefs" is derived from Mayor Bartle, who 35 years prior, founded the Native American-based honor society known as The Tribe of Mic-O-Say within the Boy Scouts of America organization, which earned him the nickname, "The Chief".

The Chiefs' first Kansas City home was at 22nd and Brooklyn, called Municipal Stadium, which opened forty years earlier in 1923 and had 49,002 seats. The Chiefs shared Municipal Stadium with the Kansas City Athletics of Major League Baseball. The first appearance of the Chiefs in Municipal Stadium attracted just 5,721 fans for a 17–13 preseason victory over Buffalo on August 9.

Season background
The Chiefs' inaugural season in Kansas City began with owner Lamar Hunt's trade of quarterback Cotton Davidson to the Oakland Raiders, which landed the number one overall selection in the AFL Draft (which Kansas City used to select Buck Buchanan). Ironically, the Raiders would later select Gene Upshaw in 1967 for the express purpose of blocking Buchanan. The Chiefs tabbed offensive guard Ed Budde from Michigan State with their own number one selection, while stealing another future Hall of Fame inductee, Bobby Bell from Minnesota in the seventh round. Buchanan, Budde and Bell all became starters on their way to a combined 526 games with the team and all three of them played their entire careers with the Chiefs.

Rookie running back Stone Johnson, who was a sprinter in the 1960 Summer Olympics in Rome, suffered a fractured vertebra in his neck in a preseason game against Oakland on August 30 in Wichita, Kansas. He died 10 days later on September 8 and his jersey number 33 was subsequently retired. The Chiefs finished their first season in Kansas City with a 5–7–2 record and failed to reappear in the AFL Championship game for a consecutive year.

Regular season
Coming off the longest game (at that point) in football history against the Houston Oilers in the AFL championship game, hopes were high for a repeat title. The Chiefs could not find the same swagger in their new home in Kansas City for their inaugural season.  They finished at 5–7–2, which included three wins to finish the season.

Schedule

Standings

References

External links
1963 Kansas City Chiefs on Database Football

1963 Kansas City Chiefs season
Kansas City Chiefs
Kansas